Memorial Drive (formerly Sunnyside Boulevard) is a major road in Calgary, Alberta. Aside from its important role in city infrastructure, the tree lined sides of Memorial Drive serve as a living testament to the many local soldiers who died during World War I and give it a parkway look on the western section. An active path system also runs along the south side of Memorial Drive, beside the banks of the Bow River. The Calgary Soldiers' Memorial forms part of an extensive renovation to Memorial Drive, which heightens the function of the road as a monument to the city's military. The Landscape of Memory Project began in 2004, in order to revitalize a nine kilometre stretch of the road. The design incorporated "Poppy Plaza" at the corner of Memorial Drive and 10th Street NW. The plaza used "weathered steel" to create large gateways, and the plaza and adjacent river walk were lined with the same rusted metal into which quotes about the Canadian experiences of war were cut. The Peace Bridge was incorporated into the remembrance theme of Memorial Drive, though there are no explanatory plaques at the site of the bridge.
  
Memorial Drive officially begins at an interchange with Crowchild Trail in the northwest, serving as an eastern extension of Parkdale Boulevard (which, along with 3 Avenue NW, is an extension of the arterial connector Bowness Road), though the signage at 16 Avenue NW shows eastbound Bowness Road as Memorial Drive. The road continues east as a divided parkway until it passes the dual-intersection with 4 Street NE and Edmonton Trail at which point it becomes a freeway until Deerfoot Trail, where it downgrades to an at-grade expressway. Westbound traffic is offered a flyover into downtown at the 4th/Edmonton intersection. At this point the C-Train runs along the median of the split road, beginning with the Bridgeland/Memorial Station. After passing Barlow Trail, the road downgrades to a major arterial with the C-Train turning north along 36 Street E/Métis Trail after the Franklin Station. Memorial is then downgraded to traffic signalized intersections and continues east to 68th Street N.E., where it downgrades once again to a residential street for its last few blocks to its present terminus at Abbeydale Drive. 

City planners have made provisions for Memorial Drive to eventually connect with Stoney Trail. East of 36 Street E, Memorial Drive serves as the boundary between the Northeast and Southeast quadrants of the city.

Major intersections 
From west to east.

See also

 Transportation in Calgary

References 

Memorial
Roads in Calgary